John Harris Jr. (1716 – July 29, 1791 in Harrisburg, Pennsylvania), was a storekeeper and frontiersman who operated a ferry along the Susquehanna River at Harrisburg.  Harris was the son of John Harris Sr., who is considered the first settler to establish a trading post along the Susquehanna River at what would later become the state capital of Pennsylvania.

Biography

John Harris Jr. was born in Harrisburg in 1716, and after his father's death in 1748 Harris continued to operate his father's trading business and ferry operation.  For many years, Harris and his family were considered the principal store keepers on the American frontier; and at his house two notable "council fires" were held with the Indians of the Six Nations and other tribes.  At the first, June 8, 1756, Governor Morris, with his council, was present; and at the second, April 1, 1757, the deputy of Sir William Johnson, his majesty's deputy of the affairs of the Six Nations, met the representatives of the Indian Nations and many of their warriors.  It was said that John Harris Jr. had the confidence of the Indians.  At a conference of Governor Hamilton with them, August 23, 1762, they asked that "the present store-keepers may be removed and honest men placed in their stead," and selected John Harris.  Said the chief, who addressed the governor, "I think John Harris is the most suitable man to keep store, for he lives right in the road where our warriors pass, and he is very well known by us all in our Nation, as his father was before him."

Harris's house, built in 1766, along what is now Front Street in downtown Harrisburg, still stands today.  It is known as the John Harris-Simon Cameron Mansion, after Harris and a later occupant, Lincoln's first Secretary of War and Minister to Russia, and is a historic house museum.  It is a National Historic Landmark.

See also
 History of Harrisburg, Pennsylvania

References

External links
The John Harris-Simon Cameron Mansion

1716 births
1791 deaths
People from Harrisburg, Pennsylvania
People of colonial Pennsylvania
18th-century American businesspeople